The Warringah Freeway is a  divided freeway in Sydney, New South Wales that is part of the Sydney Orbital Network and the Highway 1. The primary function of the freeway is to provide an alternative high-grade route from the Sydney Harbour Tunnel and the Bradfield Highway at Milsons Point to the A8 and the Gore Hill Freeway. Completed in a series of stages between June 1968 and August 1992, the Warringah Freeway provides a vital link to access most of the suburbs in Sydney and is also a major route to the north, south, east and west of the central business district.

History

Planning began in 1951. The first stage of the road opened on 18 June 1968. As its name suggests, the road was envisioned as the first stage of a freeway system for Sydney's Manly/Warringah area. An early alignment had the freeway crossing into the Manly Warringah area via Castlecrag, then later via Castle Cove. The freeway was never extended in this direction due to opposition by the residents of Castlecrag.

A large amount of residential and commercial property, half a golf course, and a cemetery were resumed by the government to build this freeway.

The freeway originally featured a 3x2x2x3 arrangement with the inner two carriageways both running in the same direction during peak times. The changeover process was slow both on the freeway and the Harbour Bridge, with large numbers of red plastic 'candle sticks' or 'candy bars' being manually moved four times every weekday. The original north termination point of the freeway was Chandos Street, Cammeray; with a small extension being added to Willoughby road in 1978. The Chandos Street ramps were moved to Brook Street at this time.

It was not until 1992 when the Gore Hill Freeway was added to connect the Warringah Freeway to the Pacific Highway, that the road officially became part of Australia's Highway 1. Until then, it had been a short freeway that terminated curiously in the middle of the suburbs, despite being Sydney's most prominent freeway, the "F1", with 16 lanes connecting to the Sydney Harbour Bridge via the Bradfield Highway and/or the Cahill Expressway.

Warringah Freeway Upgrade

The NSW Government proposal to build the Western Harbour Tunnel & Beaches Link includes plans to upgrade the Warringah Freeway to accommodate the tunnel entries and exits. The works are expected to take about seven years and would involve significant impacts to adjacent parks (St Leonards and Cammeray Golf Course) during and after construction. Roads and Maritime Services claimed the upgrade would "streamline Australia's busiest road".

In September 2021, the design and construction contract for the Warringah Freeway upgrade was awarded to CPB Contractors and Downer EDI.

Route

Only the inner west carriageway is reversible, with the inner east carriageway feeding the tunnel southbound. All carriageways were widened by utilising the breakdown lane space, and remarking the existing lanes. After the North Sydney northbound onramp, there are 16 lanes across the whole corridor for a short distance, becoming 10 lanes before the Brook Street exit, and then 6 after the Willoughby road exit. This feeds onto the Gore Hill freeway, completed in 1992.

The arrangement is now mostly 4x3x3x3 through the section with the switchable carriageway, with variations in the width of the outer carriageways as ramps enter and exit the freeway. In 2007, major changes to the Military Road overpass have occurred with an extra three ramps added, and two extra lanes on the connecting Gore Hill freeway at the northern end (part of the Lane Cove Tunnel project). The overpass where these five ramps originate has been widened for an attempt to channel all the traffic.

The first of the new Military Road ramps opened in June 2006. Most northbound traffic now has to exit from the right of the six northbound outer carriageway lanes, instead of the left. The previous exit ramp (for a right turn into Military Road) previously had three general lanes and one bus lane. There are now no general lanes, and two bus lanes. Traffic turning left into Falcon Street still uses the old ramp. The stated reason for this change is to remove all the traffic which enters the freeway at North Sydney, then exits again at Military Road, adding to peak hour delays.

The carriageway change over process was automated around 1990, with moveable barriers and overhead signage directing traffic onto the correct lanes. The changeover occurs when the Harbour Bridge needs either 5 or 6 lanes southbound (the default is 4 each way). There is only ever a maximum of 5 lanes northbound off the bridge, with the extra lane feeding into a spare lane on the inner west carriageway. Changeover times are around 06:30 and 09:00 Monday to Friday.

A 24-hour Bus Lane (buses, taxi cabs and hire cars) was added after the Sydney Harbour Tunnel opened in 1992. It runs southbound on the outer carriageway and across the Harbour Bridge. This has proven to be a major success, carrying more persons in the morning peak hour than all other southbound lanes combined.

Almost all entry and exit ramps on the freeway are controlled by traffic signals. Most of the ramps are of sufficient length to avoid any delays to through traffic, with the exception of Military road. The arrangement for accessing the Harbour bridge (For City and west access) southbound can be confusing for anyone unfamiliar with the road, with a choice of either competing with traffic approaching the Sydney Harbour Tunnel via the two lanes at the inner eastern carriageway or having to cross the Bus Lane. The traffic improved when the Sydney Harbour Tunnel went electronic/cashless: the toll is charged either by a beep of an e-tag or by number-plate reading (unless you pay the toll within 48 hours of the number-plate reading, you will be fined); such an arrangement is not uncommon in Sydney, as the Westlink M7, Cross City Tunnel, Lane Cove Tunnel and the M2 Hills Motorway (from December 2007) are fully cashless/electronic. The toll cost is A$3 for southbound vehicles only - Same for the Sydney Harbour Bridge. The traffic improved, allowing only electronic toll enabled traffic to move more efficiently when approaching the Sydney Harbour Tunnel (southbound) at  - meaning no stopping, less wear and tear, etc.

Exits and interchanges

Tolls
Warringah Freeway itself does not have any tolls. However, a toll is charged when entering or exiting Warringah Freeway (north) to and from Military Road (A8) and Falcon Street.

Original blueprint of the Warringah Freeway

Following the opening of the first section of this freeway in 1968, there were plans for six further stages to be constructed to the north.

 Stage 1 - Willoughby Road extension, and a tunnel under the North Shore Line. Planned completion 1973. Willoughby road extension completed 1978. Tunnel under the railway completed 1992 as part of the Gore Hill Freeway.
 Stage 2 - Northbridge to Castlecrag, and Wakehurst Parkway link. Planned completion 1974. Never built due to lobbying by the Castlecrag Progress Association.
 Stage 3 - Bridge over Middle Harbour between east Castlecrag and Seaforth. Planned completion 1974. Never built due to lobbying by the Castlecrag Progress Association.
 Stage 4 - Seaforth to Balgowlah spur link. Planned completion 1974. Never built due to lobbying by the Castlecrag Progress Association.
 Stage 5 - Upgrade of Wakehurst Parkway to freeway conditions to Warringah Road. Spur link to Manly Vale. Planned completion 1977. Partially completed (Burnt Bridge Creek Deviation) 1985.
 Stage 6 - Willoughby Road to Pacific Highway/Epping road junction. Planned completion 1980. Completed 1992 as the Gore Hill Freeway.

Various proposals over the years have been made to complete the Warringah Freeway to the area of its name, due to the chronic traffic problems afflicting the North Shore from Mosman to Chatswood. The residents of Castlecrag, who opposed the construction of this freeway, also suffer from these traffic problems, however, they find this preferable to the environmental and aesthetic amelioration that the area would have suffered, had the construction of Stage 3 gone ahead.

In the early 2000s, one proposal from the Liberal state opposition was for the construction of a six lane tunnel starting at the Burnt Bridge Creek Deviation in Balgowlah, joining the Gore Hill Freeway. The Liberal Party formed state government in 2011, and the proposal became known as the Beaches Link.

In popular culture
The freeway was briefly seen in the 1974 feature film Stoner.

See also

 Freeways in Australia
 Freeways in Sydney

Notes

References

External links
 RTA Live Traffic Camera
 Late 1960s planned freeway extensions
 Lane Cove Tunnel Project
 

Highways in Sydney
Roads with a reversible lane
Highway 1 (Australia)
Castlecrag, New South Wales